The 7th Washington D.C. Area Film Critics Association Awards were given on December 8, 2008.

Winners
Best Actor
 Mickey Rourke – The Wrestler

Best Actress
 Meryl Streep – Doubt

Best Animated Film
 WALL•E

Best Art Direction
 The Curious Case of Benjamin Button

Best Breakthrough Performance
 Dev Patel – Slumdog Millionaire

Best Cast
 Doubt

Best Director
 Danny Boyle – Slumdog Millionaire

Best Documentary Film
 Man on Wire

Best Film
 Slumdog Millionaire

Best Foreign Language Film
 Let the Right One In (Låt den rätte komma in) • Sweden

Best Screenplay – Adapted
 Slumdog Millionaire – Simon BeaufoyBest Screenplay – Original Rachel Getting Married – Jenny LumetBest Supporting Actor Heath Ledger – The Dark Knight

Best Supporting Actress
 Rosemarie DeWitt – Rachel Getting Married

References

External links
 The Washington D.C. Area Film Critics Association

2008
2008 film awards